The Cayuse Hills,  el. , is a small mountain range northeast of Big Timber, Montana in Sweet Grass County, Montana.

See also
 List of mountain ranges in Montana

Notes

Mountain ranges of Montana
Landforms of Sweet Grass County, Montana